The 2018 Pendle Borough Council Election took place on 3 May 2018.

Background
Before the election, the Conservatives have 23 councillors, with Labour on 15 and the Liberal Democrats on 9. There is currently no overall control on Pendle Borough Council. 16 seats are up for election.

The last BNP Councillor in the UK, Brian Parker (Marsden Ward Councillor), is retiring at the election, and has supported the Labour candidate in his constituency.

Election Result

Ward Results

References

2018 English local elections
2018
May 2018 events in the United Kingdom
2010s in Lancashire